Karl Thopia was an Albanian feudal prince and warlord who  ruled Albania from the middle of the 14th century until the first Ottoman conquest of Albania. Thopia usually maintained good relations with the Roman Curia.

Family

The first mention of the Thopia is from 1329, when Tanusio Thopia was mentioned as one of the counts of Albania. In 1338, Tanusio was mentioned as Count of Matia (conte di Matia). According to Karl Hopf, Tanusio's son or brother Andrea I, as told by Gjon Muzaka (fl. 1510), had fallen in love with an illegitimate daughter of King Robert of Naples when her ship, en route to the Principality of the Morea to be wed with the bailli, had stopped at Durazzo where they met. Andrea abducted and married her, and they had two sons, Karl and George. King Robert, enraged, under the pretext of reconciliation had the couple invited to Naples where he had them executed. Karl Thopia is first mentioned in 1350, at a time when Anjou still owned Durrës.

Control of Durrës and the Princedom of Albania
The long protracted turmoil of dynastic wars had made germinate in their real victims, the Albanians, the seeds of national sentiment which contained great promise, so that, when after Emperor Stefan Dušan's death, a descendant of Stefan Uroš I, returned to the province, the inhabitants rose en masse and, under the leadership of Karl Thopia, cut down the pretender and his entire force in the battle of Acheloos.

In 1358, Karl rose against the rule of the Anjou and managed to drive them out of Durrës from Epirus and Albania.  He ruled most of modern central Albania from 1358 to 1388 and claimed the title of princeps Albaniae.

Since 1362, Karl sought Durrës, which was in the possession of Duchess Joanna. The first, certainly still unsuccessful siege lasted from April 1362 until May 1363. Then, Thopia had to withdraw his troops, who were weakened by an epidemic disease.  Only in 1367 could Karl conquer Durrës, who had attained in the meantime the tacit agreement of the Venetians for his project and turn this important port into his residence.

Karl gained control of Durrës in 1368, which was where the Angevins held out due to their Kingdom becoming smaller in size. In 1374, Pope Gregory XI awarded him the title "Grande Conte d'Albania" (Great Count of Albania).  Karl lost Durrës in 1376, conquered by Joanna's husband Louis, but recovered it in 1383 when the last mercenaries of the Navarrese Company moved to Greece.

Thopia ruled over the regions of Durrës, Kruja, Peqin, Elbasan, Mokra and Gora, that is, along both sides of the Via Egnatia as far east as Lake Ohrid.

Rivalry with the Balsha II
In 1380, Karl Thopia tried to make an alliance with King Louis I of Hungary, who confirmed it in the possessions he had in Durrës and the surrounding area. This alliance was not welcomed by either the Venetians or the Roman Curia, as long as the Hungarian king supported Avignon's antipope. Rejecting Charles's legitimacy over Durrës, the Pope turned his brother-in-law Balša II against him.

Balša II made a fourth attempt to conquer Durrës, an important commercial and strategic center, which was ruled by his rival, Karl Thopia. In 1385, Balša II started an offensive, capturing Durrës from Karl Thopia the following year, and proclaimed himself Duke of Durazzo (Durrës). Thopia called on the Turks for assistance. Murad I gladly sent an army of 40,000 men from Macedonia. In the plain of Savra between Elbasan and Lushnjë, Balša II fought the Turks and was defeated and killed. Thopia again gained control over Durazzo, probably under Ottoman suzerainty.

Venetian alliance

In the last decade of his rule, Karl closely followed the Republic of Venice, particularly with regard to foreign policy. On 17 August 1386, Karl Thopia allied himself with Venice and committed himself to participate in all wars of the Republic or pay auxiliary funds and supply grain. In addition, he promised the Venetian buyers protection in his lands. In return, Venice supplied a galley, permitted recruitment of Thopia's mercenaries in Venetian areas and instructed the captain of their Adriatic fleet to protect Karl's coasts from the Ottomans. The Ottomans undertook several heavy attacks on Durrës, which also still persisted as Karl died in January 1388. His son, Gjergj, became Karl's successor.

St. Gjon Vladimir's Church

In 1381, Karl built the St. Gjon Vladimir's Church in the proximity of Elbasan, where Jovan Vladimir's remains were held until 1995.
He is depicted in the icon of St. Vladimir, painted by Onufri, wearing a crown and standing by the Church of the Saint.

Inscriptions:
A calligraphic inscription in Greek says: "ΚΑΡΛΑ ΘΕΩΠΙΑϹ ΚΑΙ ΚΤΗΤΩΡ ΤΗϹ ΑΓΙΑϹ ΜΟΝΗϹ ΤΟΥ ΑΓΙΟΥ" (Karla Theopias, builder of the Holy Monastery of the Saint).
Another Greek inscription in the building refers to him as: "... ο πανυψηλώτατος πρώτος Κάρλας Θεωπίας ανεψιός δε και αίματος ρύγας της Φραγγίας... οικοδόμησεν τον πάνσεπτον ναόν τούτον του αγίου Ιωάννου του Βλαδιμήρου ..." (the highest and prime Karlas Theopias, nephew and by blood king of Francia ... built this holy church of St. John Vladimir ... ) dated 1382. This inscription is currently located in the Albanian Historical Museum in Tirana.
"These signs of a great lord ... Carla Thopea" (ετούτα τα σιμάδηα αυθέντου μέγα ... Κάρλα Θοπήα).

Issue
Karl married Vojislava Balšić, in  1370. The pair had four children:

Gjergj Thopia (fl. 1388–d. 1392), Lord of Durrës (Durazzo), married Teodora Branković
Helena Thopia (fl. 1388–1403), married Venetian count Marco Barbadigo (first marriage) and lord Konstantin Balšić (second marriage)
Voisava Thopia, married N. Cursachio (first marriage) and in 1394, Progon Dukagjini, Lord of Lezhë and uncle of Pal Dukagjini (second marriage)

Karl had two more children but the parentage is unknown:

Maria Thopia, married Filippo di Maramonte
Niketa Thopia, married a daughter of Komnen Arianiti.
Mara, married Balša III in 1407 (divorced by 1412).

References

Sources 
 

14th-century births
1387 deaths
14th-century Albanian people
Karl
Karl
People from Durrës
Albanian Roman Catholics